Coral bush may refer to various flowering plants:

Ardisia crenata
Ardisia japonica
Jatropha multifida
Templetonia retusa
Cockspur coral bush (Erythrina crista-galli)